Raymond Durand (28 January 1894 – 26 November 1977) was a French sports shooter. He competed in the 50 m rifle event at the 1936 Summer Olympics.

References

1894 births
1977 deaths
French male sport shooters
Olympic shooters of France
Shooters at the 1936 Summer Olympics
People from Langres
Sportspeople from Haute-Marne